Omar Jehad Al Somah (born 28 March 1989) is a Syrian professional footballer who plays as a striker for Qatar Stars League club Al-Arabi, on loan from Saudi club Al Ahli, and the Syria national team. Nicknamed in Syria as Al ʿAqqid which is a historical civil character in Damascus known for participating in the resistance against occupiers and for being courageous, helpful and generous.

In July 2014, Al Somah joined Al Ahli in the Saudi Pro League. He went on to become the league top goalscorer in 2015, 2016 and 2017. He helped Al Ahli win the league in 2016, their first in 32 years.

Club career

Al Futowa 
Al Somah began his football career at the age of 12, joining the youth academy of Al Futowa (Deir ez-Zor) which won the 2007–08 Syrian under-18 league; Al Somah was the top scorer of the league that season with 29 goals.

Al Qadsia
On 30 June 2011, Al Somah joined Al Qadsia in the Kuwaiti Premier League.

In July 2012, Al Somah participated in three games with Nottingham Forest, scoring once in a month-long trial.

Al Ahli
During the 2018–19 season, Al Somah scored 19 goals in 24 matches for Saudi Professional League side Al Ahli. On 1 March 2019, he scored an overhead kick against Al-Ittihad.

On 29 November 2020, Al Somah scored a goal in a 2–1 win over Al-Faisaly, in which he managed in seven seasons to equal Nasser Al-Shamrani's record of 126 goals in eleven seasons in the Saudi League. On 22 December, he broke the record by scoring his 127th goal in a 1–0 win over Al Fateh.

Al-Arabi (loan)
On 9 August 2022, Al Somah joined Qatari side Al-Arabi on a one-year loan.

Style of play
Uniquely, Al Soma's height, strength, jumping ability and heading technique have given him an edge in winning aerial challenges for balls, with many of his goals often being headers, he also scores with both feet.

Personal life
Al Somah is married since 2015 and has two children.

Philanthropy
In February 2019, Al Soma donated USD$6,000 to Al-Fotuwa, the club he started his career with.

Career statistics

Club

International goals
Scores and results list Syria's goal tally first.

Honours
Al Futowa
 Syrian Premiere Division U-18 League: 2007–08
 Syrian Second Division Northern Group: 2009–10

Al Qadsia
 Kuwaiti Premier League: 2011–12, 2013–14
 Kuwait Emir Cup: 2012, 2013
 Kuwait Crown Prince Cup: 2013, 2014
 Kuwait Federation Cup: 2013–14
 Kuwait Super Cup: 2011, 2013, 2014
 AFC Cup: 2014

Al Ahli
 Saudi Crown Prince Cup: 2014–15
 Saudi Professional League: 2015–16
 King Cup: 2016
 Saudi Super Cup: 2016

Syria
 WAFF Championship: 2012

Individual
 IFFHS AFC Men's Team of the Decade 2011–2020
 Saudi Professional League Player of the Month: October 2014, October 2015, November 2020
 Al-Ahli Player of the Year: 2014–15, 2015–16
 Syrian Premiere Division U-18 League top scorer: 2007–08 (29 goals)
 Kuwaiti Premier League top scorer: 2013–14 (23 goals)
 Saudi Professional League Golden Boot: 2014–15, 2015–16, 2016–17
 Player of the Month in Kuwaiti Al-Qadisiyah Club: December 2013.
 Player of the season in Kuwaiti Al-Qadisiyah Club: 2014
 Player of the season in the Saudi League: 2016
 2015 AFC Champions League Bronze Boot.
 Sixth top scorer in the world 2016.
 Best Asian goalscorer in the world 2016.
 The King's Cup 2015/16 Top Scorer Award.
 Best professional striker in the Gulf 2016.
 Arab top scorer 2016 as the most recorded player in the Arab leagues.
 Top scorer in the Crown Prince Cup 2016/17.
 The best striker in the Saudi League 2017/18.
 The award for the best Arab player for the year 2018 from (Riyadh.com magazine).
 Silver Boot in the Saudi League 2018.
 The best goal of the season in the Saudi League 2019.
 Best striker in the group stage of the AFC Champions League 2019.
 AFC Champions League 2019 squad of the year.
 2019 Syrian Player of the Year award
 Best Syrian Professional Award for the year 2020.
 The Bronze Boot in the Saudi League 2020.
 Top scorer of the decade in the Saudi League 2011-2020.

References

External links

 
 

1989 births
Living people
People from Deir ez-Zor
Association football forwards
Syrian footballers
Qadsia SC players
Al-Ahli Saudi FC players
Al-Arabi SC (Qatar) players
Syrian Premier League players
Kuwait Premier League players
Saudi Professional League players
Qatar Stars League players
Syria international footballers
2019 AFC Asian Cup players
Syrian expatriate footballers
Syrian expatriate sportspeople in Kuwait
Syrian expatriate sportspeople in Saudi Arabia
Syrian expatriate sportspeople in Qatar
Expatriate footballers in Kuwait
Expatriate footballers in Saudi Arabia
Expatriate footballers in Qatar